Presidential elections are due to be held in the Comoros in 2024 alongside regional elections.

Electoral system
Until 2018, the presidency of the Comoros rotated between the country's three main islands; Anjouan, Grande Comore and Mohéli. The 2010 elections were limited to Mohélian candidates and the 2016 elections saw candidates from Grand Comore contest the elections. The next presidential election would have seen a president elected from Anjouan.

However, a constitutional referendum in July 2018 saw voters approve constitutional amendments that scrapped the rotation system and instituted a standard two-round system in which a candidate has to receive a majority of the vote in the first round to be elected, with a second round held if no candidate is able to win in the first round. The changes also moved the next presidential elections forward to 2019 and allowed incumbent President Azali Assoumani run for a second term.

The referendum led to violent protests and an armed uprising in Anjouan in October 2018, which was stopped by the military after several days.

References

2024 elections in Africa
2024 in the Comoros
2024